The Zhangjiajie–Jishou–Huaihua high-speed railway is a high-speed railway in China. The line runs parallel to the Jiaozuo–Liuzhou railway, but on a faster alignment. It was opened on 6 December 2021.

History
Construction began on 18 December 2016. It was opened on 6 December 2021.

Stations
The line has the following stations:
Zhangjiajie West
Furongzhen
Guzhang West
Jishou East
Fenghuanggucheng (interchange to Fenghuang Maglev)
Mayang West
Huaihua South

References

High-speed railway lines in China
Railway lines opened in 2021

25 kV AC railway electrification